Eddy Jaspers (born 15 April 1956) is a Belgian footballer. He played in three matches for the Belgium national football team in 1984.

References

External links
 

1956 births
Living people
Belgian footballers
Belgium international footballers
Place of birth missing (living people)
Association football defenders